Entylia is a genus of treehoppers in the family Membracidae. There are at least three described species in Entylia.

Species
These three species belong to the genus Entylia:
 Entylia carinata (Forster, 1771) c g b
 Entylia emarginata b
 Entylia turrita b
Data sources: i = ITIS, c = Catalogue of Life, g = GBIF, b = Bugguide.net

References

Further reading

External links

 

Smiliinae
Auchenorrhyncha genera